Mark Ioane (born 3 December 1990) is a New Zealand professional rugby league footballer who plays as a  for the Keighley Cougars in the Betfred Championship.  

He has previously played for the Gold Coast Titans and St. George Illawarra Dragons in the NRL, and the London Broncos and Leigh Centurions in the Championship and the Betfred Super League.

Early years
Ioane was born in Auckland, New Zealand. He attended De La Salle College in Mangere East.

Playing career

New Zealand Warriors
Ioane was signed by the New Zealand Warriors and played 25 games for the Junior Warriors in the 2010 Toyota Cup, scoring four tries. He started at prop in the grand final, won by the Junior Warriors 42-28. 

He was selected by the Junior Kiwis at the end of 2010.

Canberra Raiders
In 2011 Ioane joined the Canberra Raiders but could not break into the first grade side. While at the Raiders Ioane played for the Souths Logan Magpies in the Queensland Cup and the Mount Pritchard Mounties in the NSW Cup. Ioane won the Mounties player of the year award in 2012.

Gold Coast Titans
Ioane signed for the Gold Coast Titans in 2013 on a one season deal and played for the Burleigh Bears in the Queensland Cup. He was named to make his National Rugby League debut for the Gold Coast against the New Zealand Warriors on 5 May 2013.

St. George Illawarra Dragons
On 1 July 2015, Ioane joined the St. George Illawarra Dragons mid-season for the rest of the year.

London Broncos
On 9 November 2015, he signed one-year contract with English Kingstone Press Championship side, London Broncos starting in 2016.

Leigh Centurions
Ioane joined the Leigh Centurions ahead of the 2020 RFL Championship season.  On 28 May 2022, Ioane played for Leigh in their 2022 RFL 1895 Cup final victory over Featherstone.

Keighley Cougars
Released by Leigh after three seasons, Ioane signed for Keighley in October 2022 on a two-year deal.

References

External links

Leigh Centurions profile
SL profile

1990 births
Living people
Burleigh Bears players
Gold Coast Titans players
Junior Kiwis players
Keighley Cougars players
Leigh Leopards players
Mount Pritchard Mounties players
New Zealand sportspeople of Samoan descent
New Zealand rugby league players
People educated at De La Salle College, Māngere East
Rugby league players from Auckland
Rugby league props
Souths Logan Magpies players
St. George Illawarra Dragons players